Infanta Maria Teresa of Spain (12 November 1882 in Madrid, Kingdom of Spain – 23 September 1912 in Madrid, Kingdom of Spain) was the second eldest child and daughter of Alfonso XII of Spain and his second wife Maria Christina of Austria. Maria Teresa was an Infanta of Spain and a member of the House of Bourbon by birth.

Marriage and issue
Maria Teresa married her first cousin, Prince Ferdinand of Bavaria, Infante of Spain, eldest son and child of Prince Ludwig Ferdinand of Bavaria and his wife Infanta María de la Paz of Spain, on 12 January 1906 in Madrid. Maria Teresa and Ferdinand had four children:

Infante Luis Alfonso of Spain (6 December 1906 - 14 May 1983)
Infante José Eugenio of Spain (26 March 1909 - 16 August 1966)
Infanta Maria de las Mercedes of Spain (3 October 1911 - 11 September 1953) 
Infanta Maria del Pilar of Spain (15 September 1912 - 9 May 1918)

Arms

Ancestry

References

Spanish infantas
Bavarian princesses
1882 births
1912 deaths
House of Bourbon (Spain)
House of Wittelsbach
Collars of the Order of Isabella the Catholic
Knights Grand Cross of the Order of Isabella the Catholic
Burials in the Pantheon of Infantes at El Escorial
Nobility from Madrid
Deaths in childbirth
Daughters of kings